Four bridges on three lines is a сrossing by two railroad lines of two streets in St. Petersburg, Russia.

Rail bridges in Saint Petersburg